Malheur Reservoir is an irrigation lake along Willow Creek in Malheur County in the U.S. state of Oregon.

About 80 percent of the  shoreline is privately owned, but the lake and part of the shore is open to public use. Since the mid-1960s, the reservoir has been stocked with rainbow trout, although fishing conditions have varied with weather cycles, and the reservoir has at times gone dry during drought.

The lake has a boat ramp on the north shore, and camping is possible in a few places near the ramp. The Malheur County Parks Department maintains the boat ramp as well as gravel parking and a restroom.

See also
List of lakes in Oregon

References

Lakes of Malheur County, Oregon
Reservoirs in Oregon
Buildings and structures in Malheur County, Oregon
Protected areas of Malheur County, Oregon
1930s establishments in Oregon